Coding it Forward is an American 501c3 non-profit organization with the goal of building a talent pipeline into civic tech, primarily through creating and marketing data science and technology internships in federal government agencies for undergraduate and graduate students at colleges and universities across the United States.

History
Several Harvard University students were inspired by former Chief Technology Officer of the United States Megan Smith's appeal for technologists to work in public service at the annual Grace Hopper Celebration of Women in Computing. They started a blog highlighting how students were contributing to civic tech, which grew to 800 members within two months. Two of the students took a course with the former Deputy Chief Technology Officer of the United States Nick Sinai where they had the opportunity to work on tech projects in government. That experience led to the idea of organizing tech focused student internships in government.

Civic Digital Fellowship
The primary program of Coding it Forward is their Civic Digital Fellowship, a competitive 10-week data science and technology internship program for undergraduate and graduate students in United States federal agencies. They have received more than 1,100 applications from students from more than 175 colleges and universities for 50 fellowship positions. Among six federal agencies, the 50 students learn by working on group projects to improve their departments and the way in which they work. The fellows receive a paycheck, which is unlike many other internship programs in the government.

Growth

Recognition

Co-founders Athena Kan and Chris Kuang gave the closing keynote at the 2018 Code for America Summit in Oakland, CA, in front of an audience of 1,200 civic technologists (Video of Keynote).

Funders
The organization has received support from philanthropic sources such as the Chan Zuckerberg Initiative, the Knight Foundation, and the Shuttleworth Foundation.

References

2017 establishments in the United States
Non-profit organizations based in Boston
Organizations established in 2017
Technology in society